Emenike is a Nigerian surname that may refer to
Alex Emenike, (born 1989), Nigerian football player
 Emmanuel Emenike (born 1987), Nigerian football player
Mbachu Uchenna Emenike (born 1989), Nigerian-born football winger
Uzoechi Emenike (born 1994), English singer professionally known as MNEK